Rogers D. Beckett, Jr. (born January 31, 1977), familiarly 'Red', is a former American football safety, that went to high school at Apopka High School. He was drafted in the second round of the 2000 NFL Draft. He played for the San Diego Chargers and the Cincinnati Bengals in his professional football career. After retiring from professional football, he completed his master's degree in Public Administration. Beckett currently resides in Apopka, Florida. He has one daughter, Astoria, and two sons Bralen and Camren.  His cousin is screenwriter/filmmaker Lauren C. King.

References

1977 births
Living people
People from Apopka, Florida
Players of American football from Florida
American football safeties
Marshall Thundering Herd football players
Cincinnati Bengals players
San Diego Chargers players
Sportspeople from Orange County, Florida